The Artie Lange Show was an American sports entertainment radio show hosted by comedian Artie Lange, airing from October 2011 to April 2014 on the Audience Network, DirecTV, SiriusXM Satellite Radio and several terrestrial radio stations by Premiere Radio Networks. It originally launched as The Nick & Artie Show with Lange co-hosting with comedian Nick DiPaolo until DiPaolo's departure in January 2013. The three-hour show aired live from New York City from Monday to Friday at 10:00 p.m EST. From September 7, 2012, the show aired live on the Audience Network on Fridays at 10:00 p.m. EST from Tuesday to Friday.

The featured commentary on sports and entertainment news, interviews with sports figures and celebrities, and listener phone calls. The show was available for live streaming and download as a podcast. On April 28, 2014, the show was cancelled. Lange announced it that day, the show's final broadcast.

Personnel
Artie Lange – host
Nick DiPaolo - host (2011-2013)
Jon Ritchie – co-host (2013-2014)
Shane Elrod – head of content and production
Dan Falato – producer
Liz Canavan – score girl
Marie Canavan – score girl
Mike Bocchetti – announcer

Availability
The Artie Lange Show was available on the Audience Network channel 239 on DirecTV, SiriusXM Sports Zone (Channel 92), Extreme Talk on iHeartRadio, and terrestrial radio affiliates throughout the United States. It is streamed at the show's website, Stitcher Radio app on smartphones and websites of affiliates. It is available as a podcast. The following is a list of affiliates:

References

External links
The Artie Lange Show Official Website
The Artie Lange Show Mobile App
The Artie Lange Show Podcast on iTunes
The Artie Lange Show Facebook page
The Artie Lange Show Twitter page

American talk radio programs
2011 radio programme debuts
2014 radio programme endings
Audience (TV network) original programming